India has faced a number of riots both before and after its independence. Here is a list of riots in India:

Riots in Pre-Independent India

Riots In Post-Independent India

From 1945 to 2000

Post 2000

See also

List of massacres in India
Religious violence in India
List of riots in Mumbai

Notes

References

 https://www.indiatoday.in/magazine/indiascope/story/19871015-agitation-by-backward-vanniyar-community-rocks-tamil-nadu-799377-1987-10-15

India
Riots
India crime-related lists